Esperanza mía (Hope of Mine) is a 2015 Argentinean telenovela. With script by Lily Ann Martin, Claudio Lacelli and Marta Betoldi] with production of Pol-ka was issued by Canal 13 between April 6, 2015 and January 14, 2016. For its recording, the producer acquired resolution cameras 4K UHD. It stars Mariano Martínez and Mariana Espósito. It also has the performances of Tomás Fonzi, Ana María Picchio, Carola Reyna, Federico D'Elía, Ángela Torres, Gabriela Toscano, Rita Cortese, Natalie Pérez and Franco Masini. In July 2015, a theatrical adaptation was presented at the Teatro Ópera in Buenos Aires, Argentina.

Story
Julia Albarracín (Mariana Espósito)is a 21-year-old girl who lives in Colonia La Merced, a small town in the province of Buenos Aires, along with Blanca, her adoptive mother. The pollution generated by the plant where Blanca works makes her extremely sick, resulting in her eventual death. Before she dies, she gives her daughter the necessary evidence to prove the responsibility of the factory and therefore, of its owners. When Julia tries to resort to justice, two thugs sent by one of the owners of the company begin to persecute her, so she escapes to Buenos Aires, Argentina to ask for help from an old friend of her mother, Concepción (Ana Maria Picchio). Concepción is the superior mother of the Santa Rosa Convent and decides to pass Julia as a novice and changing her name to "Esperanza", to hide her identity and protect her. The young woman enters the convent, but her arrival generates several conflicts with the rest of the nuns. There she meets Clara Anselmo (Gabriela Toscano), a nun who turns out to be her biological mother.

Tomás Ortiz (Mariano Martínez)is a young priest who returns to Buenos Aires, Argentina, his hometown. Together with his brother Máximo (Tomás Fonzi) owns the factory that Julia tries to denounce. Máximo is the one who is in charge of the company and is aware of the contamination complaints. He is engaged to Eva Monti (Natalie Pérez), his brother's ex girlfriend. Tomás begins to help Santa Rosa Convent, which leads him to establish a very special bond with Esperanza. Both begin to fall in love, but his religious vocation and her supposed novice role make them live a forbidden romance.

Production
The production was halted on April 18, 2015, because of a labor strike of all Argentine actors, decided by theAsociación Argentina de Actores. Producer Adrián Suar criticized it, as the program had an expensive location shooting prepared for that day. The telenovela will have cameos of other actors. Valeria Lynch played a "rocker" nun, who became friend with Esperanza. Jimena Barón, Esperanza's cousin and best advisor, who composes commercial jingles. She joined the cast during a controversial break up with soccer player Daniel Osvaldo. She was planning by then to move to Europe, but eventually gave up those plans and stayed in Argentina. As a result, she asked to join the cast again.

Reception
As Lali Esposito has a big fanbase, the program was presented with a show in La Plata. It included a show by Luciano Pereyra, the author of a production theme. The show soon became a trending topic on Twitter.

El Trece had good ratings in the prime time in 2015, thanks to the Turkish telenovela Binbir Gece (translated in Argentina as "Las mil y una noches"). Esperanza mía kept important ratings as well.

Federico Kunz, a priest from the San Luis province, started an online petition asking for the removal of the program. He considers that the story of a romantic love between a priest and a fake nun is insulting for religious people. As the main characters would eventually kiss at some point, he considers that it would be insulting to clerical celibacy as well. The petition started on March 9, and have more than 5,000 supporters. The TV channel El Trece is not concerned about the petition, and kept producing new episodes.

Other media
Mariano Martínez reported in a radio interview that there are projects to make a theater adaption of the telenovela, during the 2015 winter season.

The actresses of the telenovela appeared in the first program of Showmatch in 2015, characterized as the monks, and made a musical show. They made similar musicals in the program afterwards.

International releases
The series was released in Chile in December 2016 by Chilevision. Although the original series is in Spanish, it was dubbed by local actors. This proved to be controversial among the Chilean audiences, so Chilevision clarified that the intention was to remove the Argentine local slang, as the jokes may be otherwise difficult to be understood by non-Argentine audiences. This dubbing was criticized because the voices got out of synch with the action, and because the lead voice actress would lack the humorous tone of Lali Espósito.

Cast
 Mariano Martínez as Tomás Ortiz
 Mariana Espósito as Julia Albarracín / Esperanza / Esperanza Julia Correa Anselmo de Ortiz
 Gabriela Toscano as Clara Anselmo de Correa
 Federico D'Elía as Jorge Correa
 Tomás Fonzi as Máximo Ortiz
 Ángela Torres as Lola Fiore
 Jimena Barón as Gilda Albarracín
 Stefano de Gregorio as Federico Minelli
 Michel Noher as Nicolás Aguilera
 Paula Chaves as Paula Gatica
 Alejandro Fiore as Germán Pereyra
 Alberto Fernández de Rosa as Bishop Marcucci
 Diego Martín Vásquez as Tinieblo
 Ana Maria Picchio as Madre Concepción
 Carola Reyna as Sor Beatriz
 Leticia Siciliani as Sor Nieves
 Valeria Lynch as Sor Celeste
 Mónica Cabrera as Juana
 Luciano Pereyra as Joaquín
 Manuel Ramos as Santiago
 Natalie Pérez as Eva Monti de Ortiz
 Franco Masini as Pedro Correa
 Federico Barga as Óscar "Osqui" Fiore
 Pedro Alfonso as Esteban "Gato" Méndez
 Mercedes Funes as Leticia Sosa
 Minerva Casero as Dominga Contreras
 Abril Sánchez as Julieta Arrain
 Bárbara Vélez as Milagros "Mili" del Pombo
 Lucas Velasco as Ángel "Monito" Marrapodi
 José María Listorti as Toty Garibaldi
 Rita Cortese as Sor Genoveva
 Karina K as Sor María
 Laura Cymer as Sor Diana
 Gipsy Bonafina as Sor Suplicio
 Vanesa Butera as Sor Carmela
 Florencia Ortiz as Alicia
 Margarita Molfino as Corina 
 Virginia Kaufmann as Pilar
 Camila Mateos as Valentina
 Lucía Pecrul as Mercedes
 Malena Luchetti as Pato
 Eliseo Barrionuevo as Miguel 
 Alejandra Majluf as Débora
 Paula Brasca as Cynthia
 Alejandro Botto as Sergio
 Belén Pasqualini as Emilia
 Andrea Garrote as Graciela
 Anita Gutiérrez as Inés
 Sabrina Rojas as Faustina
 Santiago Vázquez as Juanjo
 Carlos Kaspar as Fortunato
 Nicolás Riedel as Student of the Santa Rosa Convent

Music

Awards
 2015 Martín Fierro Awards
 Best daily fiction
 Best new actress (Leticia Siciliani)

Release history

References

External links
 Official site 
 

Catholic drama television series
2015 telenovelas
Argentine telenovelas
Pol-ka telenovelas
2015 Argentine television series debuts
2016 Argentine television series endings
Spanish-language telenovelas